Susan Hubbard is an American fiction writer and professor emerita at the University of Central Florida. She has written seven books of fiction, and is a winner of the Associated Writing Program Prize for Short Fiction and the Janet Heidinger Kafka Prize for best prose book of the year by an American woman.

Biography
She has co-edited a fiction anthology, 100% Pure Florida Fiction (University Press of Florida) and has written more than 30 short stories published in nationally and internationally circulated journals, including Ploughshares, TriQuarterly, and Mississippi Review. Her writing has been published in more than fifteen countries, including Australia, England, France, Germany, the Netherlands, Indonesia, Italy, Portugal, Spain, and Taiwan, and has been taught across America and in the United Kingdom.

Hubbard has also received teaching awards from Syracuse University, Cornell University, and the South Atlantic Administrators of Departments of English. She has been a Writer in Residence at Georgia College & State University, Milledgeville, GA; Armstrong Atlantic State University, Savannah, GA; Pitzer College, Claremont, CA; and The National Writer's Voice, Tampa. She has been a guest at Yaddo, the Djerassi Resident Artists Project, Virginia Center for Creative Arts, and Cill Rialaig. She has given more than 100 public readings and addresses on the craft of writing.

She is a native of upstate New York.

Bibliography

The Society Of S

Various

Lisa Maria's Guide for the Perplexed. Publisher Red Dress Ink, 2004. 
Lisa Maria Takes Off. Red Dress Ink, 2005.

Editor

References

External links
AWP Contest Winners
Online List of Janet Heidinger Kafka Prize Recipients
Split Rock Arts Program Author Information 

20th-century American novelists
University of Central Florida faculty
Syracuse University faculty
Cornell University faculty
Living people
Georgia College & State University faculty
21st-century American novelists
American women novelists
20th-century American women writers
21st-century American women writers
Novelists from Florida
Novelists from New York (state)
Novelists from Georgia (U.S. state)
Year of birth missing (living people)
American women academics